José Acosta Cubero (born 24 May 1947) is a Spanish Socialist politician who served in the Congress of Deputies, representing Madrid Province for the first to eighth legislatures.

References

1947 births
Living people
Members of the 1st Congress of Deputies (Spain)
Members of the 2nd Congress of Deputies (Spain)
Members of the 3rd Congress of Deputies (Spain)
Members of the 4th Congress of Deputies (Spain)
Members of the 5th Congress of Deputies (Spain)
Members of the 6th Congress of Deputies (Spain)
Members of the 7th Congress of Deputies (Spain)
Spanish Socialist Workers' Party politicians
Politicians from Madrid
Members of the 8th Congress of Deputies (Spain)